The Isle of Oléron or Oléron Island (Saintongese: ilâte d'Olerun;  or ;) is an island off the Atlantic coast of France (due west of Rochefort), on the southern side of the Pertuis d'Antioche strait.

It is the second largest island of Metropolitan France, after Corsica, with a length of 30 km and a width of 8 km. It has an area of 174 km and more than 21,000 permanent inhabitants.

History
In the 7th and 8th century, the island, along with Ré, formed the Vacetae Insulae or Vacetian Islands, according to the Cosmographia. Vaceti being another name for the Vascones, the reference is evidence to Basque (Gascon) settlement or control of the islands by that date.

It was at Oléron in about 1152 to 1160 that Eleanor of Aquitaine introduced the first 'maritime' or 'admiralty' laws in that part of the world: the Rolls of Oleron. In 1306, Edward I of England granted the island to his son, Edward II, as part of the Duchy of Aquitaine.

On 20 March 1586, the island was taken by Agrippa d'Aubigné.

During the Second World War, the island was occupied by German forces and fortified. It was liberated by Free French Forces in an amphibious assault code-named Operation Jupiter on 29 April 1945. The French cruiser Duquesne fired 550 heavy shells at the German artillery batteries. The garrison surrendered on the following day.

Geography and climate

The island has an area of about 174 km2. It is a fertile and well cultivated island on the Atlantic coast of France, that is on the Bay of Biscay.

The climate is generally mild (maritime temperate) with sufficient but not excessive rainfall, but with probably from 3 to 15 days of intense heat in the summer months of July and August, mostly grouped.

Administration
Administratively, the island belongs to the Charente-Maritime département, in the Nouvelle-Aquitaine région. The island is divided into 8 communes:

 La Brée-les-Bains
 Le Château-d'Oléron
 Dolus-d'Oléron
 Le Grand-Village-Plage
 Saint-Denis-d'Oléron
 Saint-Georges-d'Oléron (includes Boyardville)
 Saint-Pierre d'Oléron
 Saint-Trojan-les-Bains

The island has about 22,000 inhabitants.

Transportation

Since 1966, the island has been connected to the mainland by a road bridge. With a length of 2,862 m (9,390 ft) between abutments, it was the longest bridge in France at the time of construction. It is now the third one, after the Saint-Nazaire bridge and the Île de Ré bridge. It has been toll-free since 1991.

To get to the island, it is possible to arrive at the stations of Surgères, Saintes or Rochefort, then take the bus.

On the island itself, the easiest way to get around is by car or by bicycle. During the last ten years, a network of 110 kilometers of bicycle paths have been built. These bicycle lanes are mostly car-free.

Tourism

As a large Atlantic island only 3 kilometres off the Aquitanian coast of France, Oléron is a popular tourist destination. Several companies operate boat trips from the towns of Boyardville and Saint-Denis to the nearby Île d'Aix, La Rochelle, and past the Fort Boyard.  The port towns are frequently visited by tourists, especially the village of La Cotiniere. This village is the base for a hundred trawlers who sell their fish every day at 05:00 and 16:00h. La Cotiniere was the first fishing port in the department of Charente-Maritime, and the 8th of France.

Notes

Sources
Collins, Roger. "The Vaccaei, the Vaceti, and the rise of Vasconia." Studia Historica VI. Salamanca, 1988. Reprinted in Roger Collins, Law, Culture and Regionalism in Early Medieval Spain. Variorum, 1992. .

External links

   The official tourist office website for Oléron Island

 
Tourist attractions in Charente-Maritime
Islands of the Bay of Biscay
Islands of Charente-Maritime
Aunis